Zeroing may refer to:

Calibration, comparison of measurements of a device with a standard of known accuracy
Sighting in a firearm so bullets strike the point of aim
Zeroing (trade), a methodology used by the U.S. for calculating antidumping duties against foreign products
 Reducing to zero
 A fictional speedcubing technique allegedly used by Feliks Zemdegs.

See also
Zero Wing, electronic game
Zero ring, in mathematics